is a role-playing video game released for the PlayStation, developed by NK System and published by Sunsoft.

Gameplay

Reception

The game received mixed reviews according to the review aggregation website GameRankings. In Japan, Famitsu gave it a score of 25 out of 40.

References

External links
 

1998 video games
Multiplayer and single-player video games
PlayStation (console) games
PlayStation (console)-only games
Role-playing video games
Sunsoft games
Video games about evolution
Video games developed in Japan